Thomas Hamilton, 9th Earl of Haddington, KT, PC, FRS, FRSE (21 June 1780 – 1 December 1858), known as Lord Binning from 1794 to 1828, was a Scottish Conservative statesman.

Background and education
Lord Haddington was the only son of Lady Sophia, daughter of John Hope, 2nd Earl of Hopetoun, and Charles Hamilton, 8th Earl of Haddington. He was educated at the University of Edinburgh and Christ Church, Oxford.

Political career
At the beginning of the 19th century, Lord Haddington was a supporter of George Canning. He was elected as a Member of Parliament for St Germans in 1802, but did not stand for re-election in 1806. In August 1814, he was appointed one of His Majesty's Commissioners for the management of the affairs in India. He served sporadically in the House of Commons until 1827 when he was elevated to the House of Lords by the new prime minister, George Canning, who had him created Baron Melros, of Tynninghame in the County of Haddington, in the Peerage of the United Kingdom. He had previously been created a privy counsellor in 1814, and, in 1828, he succeeded to his family's Scottish earldom.

Lord Haddington went on to vote against the Reform Bill in 1831, but later changed his mind and voted for it in 1832, possibly due to the political crises surrounding its passage. Upon the rise of Sir Robert Peel to the premiership in 1834, Lord Haddington was made Lord Lieutenant of Ireland, however the government collapsed within six months, and the Whigs were once again in power. Lord Haddington was able to return to government in 1841 with the return of Sir Robert Peel to the premiership - he declined the post of Governor General of India, instead opting to become First Lord of the Admiralty and a member of the Cabinet. He held that post until January 1846, when he was shuffled to become Lord Privy Seal, a post he held until the death of the government in July.

Lord Binning's family were related to the Stanhopes and staunch supporters of Pitt's administration. Being, as the eldest son of a Scots peer, ineligible for a seat in Scotland, he was provided with an English seat in 1802 'under the peculiar protection of Mr Pitt', by Pitt's sister's father-in-law, Lord Eliot.

As might have been expected, Binning followed Pitt's line in his first Parliament, voting with him for the orders of the day, 3 June 1803, against Addington, 7 Mar., 13 and 16 Apr. (though on 15 Mar. he did not divide on Pitt's motion on the navy) and also for Fox's and Pitt's defence motions which brought down Addington, 23 and 25 April 1804. He went on to support Pitt's second administration and voted against the censure of Melville, 8 Apr. 1805. He was on the committee which investigated the 11th naval report. After Pitt's death he was one of the Pittite group led by Canning, Sturges Bourne and George Rose which held fortnightly dinners at White's, and became a steward of the Pitt Club. He voted against the Grenville ministry on Ellenborough's seat in the cabinet, 3 March 1806, and against the repeal of Pitt's Additional Force Act, 30 April. On 26 June, he asked why Scotland was excluded from the training bill; on 3 July, when he was teller against the bill, he was put down by the lord advocate who asked him why he wished to extend to Scotland a bill that his fellow oppositionists had been abusing for weeks; but promised to bring in a separate bill for Scotland.

Binning found no seat in 1806, though his friend Huskisson reported that he wished Binning's father had allowed him to contest Dover, where he might have got in at modest expense. Melville secured an opening for him from Viscount Lowther on a vacancy at Cockermouth in January 1807: Melville had suggested that Binning might come in for Haslemere on the same interest instead of Viscount Garlies, when the latter succeeded to the title in November 1806, but Binning had to wait for the next vacancy. Cockermouth was only available to him for another year, so at the general election of 1807, he found another seat on Lord Clinton's interest at Callington, through their mutual uncle Francis Drake.

In 1831 he was stripped of his hereditary title of Keeper of the Royal Park (Holyrood Park) due to the outrageous behaviour of his father in quarrying in the park. However, Thomas received £40,000 in compensation (the equivalent of £4.5 million in 2022).

Family
Lord Haddington married Lady Maria Parker, heir of George Parker, 4th Earl of Macclesfield, in 1802. They had no surviving children and the Earl died in December 1858, aged 78. On his death the barony of Melros became extinct while he was succeeded in the remaining titles by his second cousin, George Baillie-Hamilton. Lady Haddington died in 1861.

In 1828 he commissioned William Burn to remodel the family seat of Tyninghame House, which passed with the earldom to Baillie-Hamilton.

Notes

References

External links 

Oxford Dictionary of National Biography
Thomas Earl Hamilton Marsden
 

Haddington
Haddington
9
Peers of the United Kingdom created by George IV
Haddington
Haddington
Haddington
Haddington
Haddington
Members of the Parliament of the United Kingdom for English constituencies
Fellows of the Royal Society
UK MPs 1802–1806
UK MPs 1807–1812
UK MPs 1812–1818
UK MPs 1818–1820
UK MPs 1820–1826
UK MPs 1826–1830
Haddington, E9
UK MPs who were granted peerages
Members of the Parliament of the United Kingdom for St Germans
Members of the Parliament of the United Kingdom for Callington
Members of the Parliament of the United Kingdom for Mitchell